Annah, also known as Annah-of-the-Shadows, is a fictional character in the 1999 role-playing video game Planescape: Torment. Created by Chris Avellone and voiced by Sheena Easton, Annah is a tiefling who joins the game's protagonist, The Nameless One as a party member. She has been overall very well received, and is perceived as one of the best female characters in the PC gaming of that era.

Creation and conception
According to the game's lead designer and writer, Chris Avellone, Annah and another Planescape Torment playable character Fall-From-Grace were inspired by Betty and Veronica from Archie comics, "embarrassingly enough." Avellone said she was made to fit two of his design priorities, that is including a representative of a tiefling race and having a thief member in the player's party. Annah was both voiced and inspired by the Scottish singer and actress Sheena Easton, whom Avellone commended for her work. Cut content from the game included a scripted plot line of Annah being kidnapped and The Nameless One embarking on, in Avellone's words, "a twisted version of 'rescue the princess' quest".

As explained by character artist Eric Campanella, "Annah is very acrobatic and dexterous[,] so her outfit is light and made of leather. She has light arm and leg armor on one side which, combined with her agility, affords her better protection than full plate[,] since this would hamper her movement. The armor is also somewhat mismatched since [because] she is not particularly wealthy and probably acquired the pieces at different places and times in her life." Her design includes Wild West-style holsters on her thighs intended for quick-drawing her daggers and a spiked shoulder pad that is "probably more for ornamentation and gives off an intimidating air." To celebrate Saint Patrick's Day 2000, the developers released the "Power Action Leprechaun Annah" version (also created by Campanella) as a free DLC.

When the game is played, Annah is a very useful ally due to her ability to scout ahead of the party for any potential threats and traps. She is able to deal a very high amount of damage when she performs a backstab, which can make much easier a fight against a boss or some other powerful creature.

Annah is a potential love interest for The Nameless One. According to the game's vision document, "Annah has difficulties in affairs of the heart. Feelings beyond simple hostility make her terribly confused, hesitant and frustrated." If the player manages to win her affections (which "just ends in a smooch", they are rewarded with "a slight boost to her [scoring ability]".

Appearances

In the game
In the game version of Planescape Torment, Annah is a brash young tiefling (a person with fiendish heritage; one of Annah's wealthy grandparents was a fiend); her alignment is chaotic neutral. She appears to be a redheaded human woman, except for her tail. A fighter and a thief, Annah was raised by Pharod Wormhair to be a capable rogue, useful for tasks that his more ordinary underlings could not complete. Utilizing push daggers she attacks her enemies when they least expect it. She has no tolerance for anyone who is foolish or clueless. Skilled at dishing out slang-laden verbal abuse, Annah slings it at anyone who annoys her. She is somewhat superstitious, especially with regard to the Lady of Pain. Early in the game, she is encountered on the streets of Sigil. The Nameless One only gets to add her to the party during the game's mid-portion. She automatically joins the party after she completes a task for Pharod.

In the novel
In Ray and Valerie Vallese's novel adaptation, Annah is similar in personality but in many other aspects is very different from her game incarnation. In the game, Annah's sole deformity is her tail. In the book, however, Annah is described as having beige skin, six functional fingers on each hand, thin black lips that barely frame her wide mouth (which is filled with a chaotic jumble of squared-off teeth and pointed fangs), white hair that covers her head like lamb's fleece in inch-thick curls, and slits of skin instead of ears. She also wears a tightly laced dark-purple bodysuit instead of the mismatching scraps she wears in the game. In the novel, she is described as a thief/wizard instead of a fighter/thief.

Reception 
The character was received very positively by the media as well as the general public, having been regarded as one of the most interesting and beloved characters from Planescape: Torment. PC Accelerator predicted that she would "soon take the place of Lara Croft in every adolescent RPGer's heart." Eurogamer gave Annah their Gaming Globes 2000 award in the category Female Supporting Character.

GameSpot included her, noted by them as having been not a conventional female game character due to her "distinctive" Scottish accent and not even being a human by to her demonic heritage, on their 2000 lists of the ten best female characters in the PC gaming so far as chosen by the staff and the readers alike ("you loved her for that dangerous mix, her temper, and her attitude - but above all, her loyalty"). Chris Dahlen found it fascinating that, as the Nameless One, he could get immersed into role playing and interact with Annah romantically. In a later article written for Gamasutra, Dahlen indicated that he was intrigued by Annah's romance side story and that he "could go on for pages" about it. In July 2013 the New Statesman published a poem about Annah by contributor Jon Stone, written in the style of the character's distinctive speech pattern.  

However, a review in Germany's PC Player complained of Easton's voice work in the game, opining Annah "sounds like a forty-year old washerwoman and not half as attractive as she should be." Her revealing clothing was later also harshly criticized by PC Gamer in 2018. The supposed "justification [...] that as part demon, her blood runs hot and so she needs a little more… ahem… ventilation" as claimed by PC Gamer does not seem to have been ever actually claimed by the game's developers; according to Eric Campanella, it was rather "partially to show that she is a free spirit and partially because it is appealing to me as an artist."

References

Demon characters in video games
Dungeons & Dragons characters
Fantasy video game characters
Female characters in video games
Fictional half-demons
Fictional professional thieves
Planescape
Role-playing video game characters
Video game characters introduced in 1999
Video game sidekicks